The 2021–22 Big South Conference men's basketball season started non-conference play on November 9, 2021, and began conference play on January 5, 2022. The regular season ended on February 26, 2022, setting up the 2021–22 Big South Conference men's basketball tournament from March 2 to March 6.

Conference changes 

Due the offseason addition of the North Carolina A&T Aggies the Big South changed the conference play format. The conference was split into a north and south division. The north included Campbell, Hampton, High Point, Longwood, North Carolina A&T and Radford while the south consisted of Charleston Southern, Gardner-Webb, Presbyterian, UNC Asheville, USC Upstate and Winthrop. Conference play consisted of 96 total games with each team playing 16 games. Each team played 10 intra-division games and 6 cross-division games. The first 11 games of conference play consisted of 5 intra-division games and 6 cross-division games, while the last five games were all intra-division.

Head Coaches

Coach Changes 
Radford hired Darris Nichols to replace Mike Jones who left for UNC Greensboro to become head coach.

Winthrop hired Mark Prosser to replace Pat Kelsey who left for College of Charleston to become head coach.

Coaches 

Notes:

 Year at school includes 2021–22 season.
 Overall and Big South records are from the time at current school and are through the end of the 2020–21 season.
 NCAA Tournament appearances are from the time at current school only.

Preseason Awards 
The Preseason Big South men's basketball poll was released on October 20, 2021.

Preseason men's basketball polls

North 
First Place Votes in Parenthesis

 Campbell (20) - 148
 Longwood - 96
 North Carolina A&T (3) - 92
 Radford (3) - 83
 Hampton - 70
 High Point - 57

South 
First Place Votes in Parenthesis

 Winthrop (23) - 152
 UNC Ashville (3) - 131
 Gardner-Webb - 103
 Presbyterian College - 72
 Charleston Southern - 47
 USC Upstate - 41

Preseason Honors

Regular season

Conference standings

Conference Matrix

Players of the Week

Records against other conferences

Conference tournament 
The 2022 Hercules Tire Big South tournament was held at Bojangles Coliseum in Charlotte, North Carolina from March 2 to March 6.

References